American Christian musician Cory Asbury has released three solo studio albums, one collaboration album, one live album, and seventeen singles (including four promotional singles).

Studio albums

Collaborative albums

Live albums

Singles

Promotional singles

Other charted songs

Other appearances

Notes

References

External links
  on AllMusic

Christian music discographies
Discographies of American artists